Paintings by the Baroque artist Bernardo Strozzi may be found in the Palazzo Rosso in Genoa, several churches and museums in Venice, the Hermitage Museum in St Petersburg, the Musée des beaux-arts in Chambéry, the Alte Pinakothek in Munich, the Kunsthistorisches Museum in Vienna, the Museum of Fine Arts in Budapest, the National Gallery in London and the Museo del Prado in Madrid.

Australia
The release of St Peter (c.1635), oil on canvas, Art Gallery of New South Wales, Sydney

Austria
Elijah and the Widow of Zarephath (c. 1630), oil on canvas, Kunsthistorisches Museum, Vienna

France
Saint Anthony of Padua holding the Infant Jesus (c. 1625), oil on canvas, Musée des Beaux-Arts, Strasbourg

Italy

Genoa
Lament over the Dead Christ (1615–1617), St John the Baptist (1625) and St Augustine Washing Christ's Feet (1629),  all oil on canvas – Accademia ligustica di belle arti
Madonna and Child with the Infant John the Baptist (c. 1620) and Woman Cooking (c. 1625), both oil on canvas – Palazzo Rosso
Curtius Rufus Throwing Himself into the Chasm and Horatius Cocles Defending the Sublician Bridge against the Etruscans, frescoes, Villa Centurione Carpaneto, Genova – San Pier d'Arena

Other
St Lawrence Giving Alms (1615–1620), oil on canvas, Galleria nazionale d'arte antica di Palazzo Barberini, Rome
 The Miracle of Saint Diego d'Alcalà (1625), oil on canvas, Santissima Annunziata church, Levanto
 Portrait of a Knight of Malta (c. 1629), oil on canvas, Pinacoteca di Brera, Milan
 Blessed Salvatore da Horta Blessing the Sick (c. 1630), oil on canvas, Civic Collection, Novi Ligure
 St Francis, parish church, Campagnola Cremasca
 Madonna and Child with Saints Peter, Bartholomew, Simon and Anthony Abbot and the Donors, oil on canvas, Santi Pietro e Paolo church, Tiarno di Sopra, Ledro

Poland
 The Abduction of Europa (early 1640s), oil on canvas, National Museum, Poznań. One of Strozzi's largest paintings (225 cm × 342 cm)

Russia
 Old Woman at a Mirror (c. 1615), oil on canvas – Pushkin Museum, Moscow
 Allegory of the Arts, St John the Baptist, David and the Head of Goliath, Saint Secundus and the Angel and Tobias Heals his Blind Father, all oil on canvas – Hermitage Museum, St Petersburg

Spain
 Veronica and Tobias Curing his Blind Father – Museo del Prado
 Saint Cecilia – Museo Thyssen-Bornemisza

United States
Adoration of the Shepherds (1615–1618), oil on canvas, Walters Art Museum, Baltimore
St Cecilia, (1620–1625), oil on canvas, Nelson-Atkins Museum of Art, Kansas City
Act of Mercy: Giving Drink to the Thirsty, (1620), oil on canvas, John and Mable Ringling Museum of Art, Sarasota

References

Strozzi, Bernardo